is a Japanese judoka and world champion. Born in Fukuoka, Hirofumi is a graduate of Kansai University. He received a gold medal in the lightweight class at the 1965 World Judo Championships in Rio de Janeiro, and a silver medal at the 1967 World Judo Championships in Salt Lake City.

References

External links
 

Year of birth missing (living people)
Living people
Japanese male judoka
Kansai University alumni
20th-century Japanese people